Miller is an electoral district of the Legislative Assembly in the Australian state of Queensland. It was created in the 2017 redistribution. It was named after Emma Miller, a labour and suffrage activist and is represented by Mark Bailey of the Labor Party.

Miller largely covers areas from the abolished district of Yeerongpilly. Located in southern Brisbane, Miller consists of the suburbs of Chelmer, Graceville, Sherwood, Tennyson, Yeerongpilly, Rocklea, Yeronga, Fairfield, Annerley, Tarragindi and Moorooka.

Members for Miller

Election results

See also
 Electoral districts of Queensland
 Members of the Queensland Legislative Assembly by year
 :Category:Members of the Queensland Legislative Assembly by name

References

Electoral districts of Queensland